Robert William Dixon-Smith, Baron Dixon-Smith DL (born 30 September 1934), is a British farmer and Conservative Party politician. Lord Dixon-Smith is a former Shadow Minister at the Department for Communities and Local Government.

Early life and career
The son of Dixon and Alice Winifred Smith, Dixon-Smith was educated at Oundle School, at the St. Johnsbury Academy in Vermont, and Writtle Agricultural College in Essex. He served in the King's Dragoon Guards in the years 1956 and 1957, serving as a Second Lieutenant.

From 1967 to 1994, Dixon-Smith was Governor of the Writtle Agricultural College, from 1973 to 1985 chair. In 1993 and 1994, he was Chair of Anglia Polytechnic University governors, governor from 1973 to 2000 of what was originally Cambridgeshire College of Arts and Technology (now Anglia Ruskin University).

Dixon-Smith was elected to the Essex County Council in 1965, being vice chairman from 1983 to 1986, and chairman from 1986 to 1989 before losing his seat to Labour in 1993. He was briefly Shadow Minister for Environment. In 1994, he was made an Honorary Doctor at Anglia Ruskin University.

Life peer
On 11 October 1993, he was created a life peer as Baron Dixon-Smith, of Bocking in the County of Essex. In December 1998, he was appointed the Conservatives' local government spokesman in the House of Lords by party leader William Hague.

Use of controversial idiom
In July 2008, he was forced to apologise to the chamber after using the racist idiom, "nigger in the woodpile", during a House of Lords debate. Dixon-Smith said the phrase had "slipped out without my thinking", and that "It was common parlance when I was younger". He added, "I apologise, I left my brains behind".

Personal life
Lord Dixon-Smith has been married to Georgina Janet Cook, since 1960. They have one son and one daughter.

References

External links

1934 births
Living people
Conservative Party (UK) life peers 
Members of Essex County Council
Deputy Lieutenants of Essex
1st King's Dragoon Guards officers
People educated at Oundle School
St. Johnsbury Academy alumni
Life peers created by Elizabeth II